Karl Kummer (born August 3, 1909, date of death unknown) is a Swiss boxer who competed in the 1936 Summer Olympics.

In 1936 he was eliminated in the second round of the bantamweight class after losing his fight to Shunpei Hashioka.

External links
profile

1909 births
Year of death missing
Bantamweight boxers
Olympic boxers of Switzerland
Boxers at the 1936 Summer Olympics
Swiss male boxers